Joanna Horodyńska (born 30 November 1975, Tychy) is a Polish model and television stylist. she started her career as a model, and is now active on television as a stylist and presenter. She is also the designer of a clothing collection.

Private life 
Her eight-year relationship with Marek Sowa, former chairman of Atomic TV (now MTV Polska), ended in 2009.

Career 
When Horodyńska was eighteen she left the city of Tychy for Warsaw, where she worked as a model, posing three times for the Polish version of Playboy magazine. In January 2000 she posed for CKM, and in the same year she ended her career on the runway. Horodyńska then began to appear as a television presenter. She hosted (while lying in a foam-filled bath tub) a program called Pieprz ("Pepper") on Atomic TV and co-hosted a talk show called Miasto Kobiet ("City of Women") on TVN Style. In 2008 she appeared in a mobile phone advertisement for Sony Ericsson and hosted New Look on VH1 Polska.

Since March 2009, Horodyńska has hosted other TV programs, such as Gwiazdy na dywaniku ("Celebrities on the Rug"), on Polsat Café. In addition to appearing on TV,  Horodyńska edits a column in Party magazine. In 2010 she was chosen as a stylist on the program You Can Dance: Po prostu tańcz! on TVN. In October 2010 she hosted Warsaw Fashion Weekend, an event featuring Polish fashion bloggers Glamourina and fashion designers such as Michael Michalsky.

Fashion designer 
In 2010 Horodyńska designed a clothing collection called Joannahorodyńskagatta for the "GATTA" brand.

Advertisements 
 2011: advertising tights branded Gatta
 2011: advertising liquid detergent branded Dreft
 2009: advertising Rexona Women deodorant

References

External links 
 Joanna Horodyńska collection for Gatta
 Model's official blog

1975 births
People from Tychy
Polish female models
Fashion stylists
Living people
Polish television presenters
Polish fashion designers
Polish women television presenters
Models from Warsaw
Polish women fashion designers